Denise Huxtable Kendall is a fictional character who appears on the American sitcom The Cosby Show (1984–1992), portrayed by actress Lisa Bonet. Denise also stars in the first season of its spin-off sitcom, A Different World (1987). The second-born child of Cliff and Clair Huxtable, Denise is known for her eccentric clothing and free-spirited, rebellious nature, earning her a reputation as the Huxtable family's wild child. Alternating between regular and recurring character, Denise appears on the sitcom on-and-off throughout its eight-year run, from its pilot "Theo's Economic Lesson" to the seventh season episode "Cliff and Jake", for a total of 98 episodes, after which Bonet departed for the remainder of the series.

Created by comedian Bill Cosby, Denise was originally conceived as the Huxtable's eldest child until older sister Sondra was introduced in the show's second episode to establish that her parents had already successfully raised a college-educated daughter. Struggling academically, Denise drops out of school shortly after enrolling at the historically black Hillman College and briefly returns home to explore various career opportunities before traveling to Africa. While there, she meets and marries Lt. Martin Kendall, becoming stepmother to his daughter Olivia. Bonet was quickly cast as Denise because the producers found that she naturally embodied some of the character's unique traits. Based on Cosby's daughter Erinn, the show's creator incorporated real-life experiences from his relationship with his own daughter into Denise's storyline about self-discovery and independence.

Bonet had a difficult professional relationship with Cosby while working on The Cosby Show, particularly regarding her decisions to appear in the controversial film Angel Heart (1987) and subsequently pose nude for various magazines. Although Cosby denies having been opposed to Bonet's career trajectory, he developed A Different World amidst their dispute to provide the actress with a more mature platform. However, Bonet was soon fired from the spin-off shortly after its first season and temporarily rejoined the cast of The Cosby Show when she became pregnant because Cosby was unwilling to entertain the prospect of the sitcom's main character being a pregnant teenager. After leaving The Cosby Show for one year to give birth to her child, Bonet returned as a series regular at the beginning of its sixth season until Cosby ultimately fired her during season seven due to creative differences.

Within months of her debut, Denise became The Cosby Show most popular character, well-received by young adult viewers who identified with her unique sense of fashion and free-spirited attitude, while establishing Bonet as one of the decade's most popular actresses. Bonet's performance earned her a Primetime Emmy Award nomination for Outstanding Supporting Actress in a Comedy Series in 1986. Some fans criticized Bonet's role in Angel Heart for dishonoring the wholesome reputation of her best-known character. Denise did not fare as well on A Different World; critics found Bonet uninteresting and often blamed her performance for the show's unimpressive early reviews. Revered as a fashion icon, the character's eclectic style has had a profound impact on modern fashion trends; media publications frequently rank Denise among television's best-dressed characters.

Role 
The Cosby Show follows the daily goings-on of the Huxtable family, an upper-middle class African American family who reside in Brooklyn, New York. The family is run by Dr. Cliff Huxtable (Bill Cosby), an obstetrician, and his wife Clair (Phylicia Rashad), a lawyer. The second eldest of their five children, Denise is a younger sister of Sondra (Sabrina Lebeauf) and an elder sister to Theo (Malcolm-Jamal Warner), Vanessa (Tempestt Bledsoe) and Rudy (Keshia Knight Pulliam). After graduating from high school, Denise leaves home to pursue post-secondary education at the fictional, historically black Hillman College, the college both her parents and grandparents had attended.

A Different World originally focuses on the character during her freshman and sophomore years at Hillman, revolving around her as she meets new friends and adjusts to college life. However, Denise constantly struggles with her finances and academics to the point of which she ultimately drops out, becoming the first member of her family to drop out of college. After leaving Hillman, Denise returns to her childhood home in the hopes of forging her own "alternative path" towards success.

Initially interested in becoming either a fashion designer or record producer, Denise pursues several short-lived part-time jobs, from which she is either fired or quits after a brief period of time, before traveling to Africa to work as a wildlife photographer's assistant. Denise returns to the Huxtable household one year later, this time as the second wife of a divorced Naval officer, Lt. Martin Kendall (Joseph C. Phillips) – who she marries without her family's knowledge – and stepmother to his three-year-old daughter Olivia (Raven-Symoné). After developing an interest in teaching children with learning disabilities, Denise eventually decides to enroll at Medgar Evers College. Finally, Denise relocates to Asia to live with Martin, where he is stationed for the remainder of the series, while Olivia remains in Brooklyn with her parents. In the series finale, Denise phone calls her family from Asia to announce that she is pregnant with her and Martin's first child.

Development

Creation and writing
Comedian Bill Cosby became interested in developing The Cosby Show partially because he was unimpressed with popular family sitcoms airing at the time, some of which often depicted children talking back to and disrespecting their parents without suffering serious consequences. Cosby intended for The Cosby Show children to remain intelligent while emphasizing that "their parents were always smarter and—most importantly—in charge." Originally, Denise was intended to be the eldest of the Huxtable family's four children. However, Cosby also wanted the show to feature a character who was an example of parents Cliff and Clair having already successfully raised a college-educated child, hence the writers introduced eldest sibling Sondra, a Princeton University graduate, in the second episode, while Denise was relegated to the role of the Huxtable's second eldest child instead. Cosby himself is the father of five children, four daughters and one son, much like his character Cliff. All five Huxtable children are based on Cosby's own; Denise in particular was based on the creator's daughter Erinn, who was approximately Denise's same age when the series began in 1984.

According to Cosby: His Life and Times author Mark Whitaker, Cosby conceived Denise as a "hip, fashion-conscious, and a bit flaky" character. Early storylines included Denise fighting with younger sister Vanessa over the latter borrowing her sweater without permission, getting her braces removed, announcing her decision to attend college away from home, promising younger brother Theo that she is capable of sewing him a replica of an expensive designer shirt he had purchased, and tricking her parents into believing she had spent a night at a male friend's house to prove a point about their parenting style. An episode entitled "Jitterbug Break" was written to explore Cosby's interest in the ways in which different generations dance. When Denise's parents deny her permission to attend a concert, some of her friends are invited into their living room which has been converted into a dance floor by rearranging some of the furniture, allowing them room to break dance. They are eventually joined by a pair of Cliff and Clair's swing dancing friends, and a dance battle ensues between the younger and older dancers. In one of the show's more serious episodes, Denise struggles with the revelation that a teenage friend of hers is pregnant. Several episodes revolving around Denise explore her boyfriends and dating life.

Casting and portrayal 
Denise is portrayed by American actress Lisa Bonet, whose professional acting experience prior to The Cosby Show had been limited to television commercials for Barbie and McDonald's, and a guest appearance on the medical drama St. Elsewhere. Casting the role of Denise, who was still intended to be the Huxtable's eldest child at the time, was a relatively quick process. Bonet first auditioned for the show's directors, followed by its producers, then finally Cosby himself and the network executives. Cosby immediately became interested in then-15 year-old Bonet because she was wearing makeup on only one side of her face, already demonstrating some of the quirky characteristics Cosby had envisioned for the character simply by being herself. Impressed by the young actress' strong sense of self, producer Marcy Carsey recalled that Bonet attended her audition wearing braces, a "real kid" hairstyle, and an "off-center" sense of fashion that was very similar to what the show's creators had envisioned for Denise. They soon labelled Bonet a young woman who refuses to be anything but herself after the actress read for the role quite naturally, as though "she were just doing life." According to People, Denise "didn't fit into any mold, a role that seemed made for Lisa Bonet."

The actors were eventually narrowed down to three top choices for each child character, including Bonet for Denise, although she felt discouraged after overhearing one of the other two actresses vying for the same role say "She'll never get it ... Because she has braces." After Bonet learned that she had in fact been chosen for the role from director Jay Sandrich, she met with Cosby one more time, who admitted to liking her braces. According to Cosby: His Life and Times author Mark Whitaker, Cosby enjoyed "the naturalness of [Bonet's] delivery", which he found refreshing in comparison to the "stagey quality" most child actors who auditioned for the role tended to rely upon, in addition to her "exotic beauty", which he likened to that of singer Lena Horne. Once Bonet was cast, the writers began to incorporate some aspects of her personality into her character, although her own fashion sense and behavior is viewed as more "outlandish" than Denise's. At Cosby's request, costume designer Sarah Lemire was granted a weekly budget of $3000 to outfit the show's characters and frequently took significant risks with Bonet's wardrobe. However, the costume designer did have some restrictions; Lemire would have liked to have been "more outrageous with [Bonet's] hair and hats" but limited herself because she had little control over the actress hair. Praising Bonet's own taste in clothing, Lemire likened costuming her to "dressing myself if I was 20 years younger." Bonet often selected her character's outfits herself with little input from the wardrobe department.

Denise was Bonet's first major television role. Being of mixed ethnicity, her character's upbringing "as a teen-ager in a well-adjusted, upper-middle-class black family" is remarkably different from how Bonet herself grew up, which took some time for the actress to adjust to; she never knew her father and was raised by her mother in a lower-middle-class, mostly white neighborhood. However, Bonet credits her role on The Cosby Show with "helping resolve her own identity crisis". Bonet described the show's environment in 1987 as "the perfect family, where you go to work, you get tired of them and you go home", and at the time likened working alongside Cosby to "learning from a master", from whom she often sought both professional and personal advice. Actress Phylicia Rashad, who portrays Bonet's on-screen mother Clair, described Bonet as "one of the best young actresses today ... She is phenomenal for someone of her years."

Creative conflicts and A Different World 
Bonet had a tense relationship with both Cosby and the show's producers throughout most of her time on the series. Although the co-stars are believed to have gotten along well during her first three seasons on the show, their dispute first became public in 1987. According to Kara Kovalchik of Mental Floss, Bonet's alleged unprofessionalism consistently aggravated Cosby, reportedly being constantly argumentative on set, late for tapings and sometimes neglecting to attend tapings altogether. Bonet first expressed interest in pursuing a career as a dramatic film actress midway through the show's first season, originally intending to leave the series after only two years. Aged 19 at the time, she decided to make her film debut as Epiphany Proudfoot in the controversial horror film Angel Heart (1987), a role that required Bonet to film a sex scene with actor Mickey Rourke. By this time, Denise had already become the show's most popular character, while Bonet's fame increased when the film was initially assigned an X rating for its graphic content. Although her role shocked several of Bonet's fans and Cosby himself, Cosby claims that he did not mind the actress' decision to appear in the film, explaining to her "if this is something you want to do, fine. You have my blessings", and maintaining that he and Bonet have a good relationship in which he would have voiced his disapproval if he had felt otherwise. Bonet confirmed that she sought Cosby's advice when she was first offered the role because "he's a generous enough man to see beyond The Cosby Show and to see my career as what it is and what it could be". Despite granting her his approval, Cosby refused to see the film. The show's producers and NBC executives declined to comment on Bonet's decision, citing "what Bonet did off the Cosby set was her business."

Tensions increased between Bonet and Cosby when the actress posed nude for Interview and Rolling Stone magazines to promote Angel Heart. Bonet insisted "I was not concerned with how Denise was going to feel ... Nor was I looking to destroy her reputation. Instead, I felt obligated to my career and my (freedom of) artistic choice." After hearing that the photograph was generating a lot of negative feedback and press, Cosby purchased a copy of Interview himself and claims that, upon seeing Bonet's photographs for the first time, he felt "There's nothing wrong with it ... Lisa has matured due to the immediacy of her responsibilities ... I think that she is doing magnificently well for someone [at her age] doing and making decisions on her own, and she is deeply loved in my heart". The media continued to circulate Bonet's photographs heavily, which is believed to have instigated a highly publicized dispute between the actress and Cosby towards the end of the 1980s. Cosby expressed concern over how the photographs would affect The Cosby Show younger audience and Bonet's younger cast mates. Although producers felt that the scandal would disturb "the squeaky-clean Huxtable image", Cosby eventually decided to provide Bonet with her own television series, a spin-off of The Cosby Show entitled A Different World. The network agreed that Bonet was ready to star in her own series, a revelation by which she was surprised.

A Different World originally revolved around an entirely different premise and main character, starring actress Meg Ryan as Maggie Lauten – a white student adjusting to a historically black college. When Ryan left the project to focus on her film career, she was replaced with actress Marisa Tomei; Tomei's Maggie was re-written into a supporting role, becoming one of Denise's roommates, while the premise was revised into a series following Bonet's character as she adjusts to college and living away from home. The first and only Cosby Show cast member to receive their own spin-off, the media speculated that A Different World had been developed into a star vehicle for Bonet because she frequently protested the way in which Cosby directed the family-oriented Cosby Show; Emily VanDerWerff of The A.V. Club agreed that the spin-off was revised as a means of removing Bonet from The Cosby Show "in a way that would bruise fewer egos." Additionally, Cosby's decision to cast Bonet in A Different World allowed "viewers to explore the new environment through the eyes of a familiar character". Strategic Reinvention in Popular Culture: The Encore Impulse author Richard Pfefferman agreed that Denise "was at the perfect stage of development to star in a series of her own."

Filming A Different World required Bonet to relocate from New York, where The Cosby Show was taped, back to her hometown San Francisco, California. A Different World pilot revolves around Denise as she struggles to pay her dormitory fees while meeting her new roommates, Jaleesa Vinson (Dawnn Lewis) and Maggie, respectively. In addition to a diverse group of friends, Denise would also meet and be influenced by new friends and teachers "with different perspectives on life", allowing the character to "grow in profound and interesting ways." The majority of the first season revolves around Denise, the show's lead character at the time, struggling to maintain her grades.

Return to The Cosby Show 
While appearing on A Different World, Bonet married musician Lenny Kravitz in 1988 and became pregnant with their child soon afterward. Fearing how Cosby would react to the news based on previous experiences with on-set pregnancies, Bonet first consulted with producer Debbie Allen, who suggested that they approach Cosby about the pregnancy together. Allen suggested that Bonet's pregnancy be written into the series, explaining that it "would be a great thing. To see a girl who's upper class kid, having a baby, not married because she didn't want to be married…and the girls could root for her." Although Cosby listened to Allen's ideas, he and some of the show's other producers did not want to explore teen pregnancy via A Different World main character, fearing that depicting a popular, well-behaved character like Denise pregnant at such a young age would offer the wrong message to audiences. Cosby in particular was strongly opposed to the idea of a Huxtable child experiencing an unplanned pregnancy and becoming an unwed mother, concluding, "Lisa Bonet is pregnant not Denise" and rejecting Allen's proposal. Allen was reportedly upset with Cosby over his decision but understood that "he just wanted her back", and Denise's pregnancy would alter Cosby's creative vision for both series.

Bonet was fired from A Different World at the beginning of its second season, and Cosby re-hired her to appear on The Cosby Show fifth season while A Different World underwent several changes in her absence. Robert E. Johnson of Jet reported that Bonet's cast mates happily welcomed her back to the series, with Cosby assuring her "there's nothing but love here for you". While struggling at first to determine the best way to approach the return of both Bonet and Denise, Cosby ultimately decided to incorporate some real-life experiences from his relationship with his own daughter Erinn who, similar to Denise, had dropped out of school in order "to find herself", into the character's re-introduction, which evolved into a storyline about children sometimes disappointing their parents but remaining loved by them regardless. Erinn attended Spelman College, the historically black institution upon which Hillman is based.

The episode in which Denise returns home premiered on October 6, 1988. Since Cosby did not intend to add an infant character to the series, the show concealed Bonet's pregnancy using loose-fitting clothing, large coats, sofas and grocery bags. To allow Bonet time to have her baby, her character was temporarily written out of the series for one year by having Denise announce that she has decided to drop out of Hillman permanently in favor of relocating to Africa and pursuing a job opportunity as a wildlife photographer's assistant (after briefly attempting to become a fashion designer or record producer). Denise was downgraded from a main to recurring character for the remainder of the season.

Despite NBC producers alluding to the possibility of Bonet returning to A Different World permanently after giving birth, Bonet would only make one final appearance on the spin-off, a cameo during its third season, by which time the series had begun to focus on other characters. Allen created an entirely new character, Freddie Brooks, and recruited actress Cree Summer to occupy Bonet's vacancy as the show's "earthy, bohemian" character. In the wake of Bonet's departure, Tomei was also fired and her character written out of the series despite Allen's original intentions to retain "the dynamic of having a white girl in a black college." Although A Different World would remain a spin-off of The Cosby Show, Denise's absence severed connections between the two shows apart from the fact that Hillman is her father's alma mater during its earliest seasons.

Departure 

Having spent the majority of season five away on maternity leave, Bonet resumed her role on The Cosby Show full-time upon giving birth to daughter Zoë Kravitz; Denise returns home after secretly marrying Lt. Martin Kendall (Joseph C. Phillips), a Naval officer she had met while working in Africa, becoming stepmother to his three-year-old daughter Olivia (Raven-Symoné). Philips originally guest starred in an early episode of The Cosby Show as one of Sondra's love interests before he was recast as Denise's husband for the remainder of the series. The sixth season premiere "Denise: The Saga Continues", in which Denise returns home to Brooklyn unannounced and introduces her parents to her new family, established the sitcom's season premieres as episodes in which a Huxtable child would inform their parents about very surprising news. Bonet would continue to appear on the show regularly over the next several episodes until Cosby fired her altogether at the end of season seven, officially citing "creative differences". The season's 24th episode "Cliff and Jake", which aired on April 11, 1991, marks Bonet's final appearance on the show. Cosby claims that he fired Bonet because The Cosby Show material was no longer challenging for her, blaming himself for her character lacking development: "it's not funny to have someone 21 acting like she's still about 12." However, he commended Bonet's acting talent. Cosby then decided to divide Bonet's screen time among new young actors "on the show who are working hard, studying so heard and really deserve a shot during what will be our final year." Introduced during the show's later seasons, Pam Tucker (Erika Alexander), a cousin of the Huxtable family, is considered to be a "replacement" for Denise; StyleBlazer believes that Pam was created because the sitcom "needed another character to play a free-spirited problem child."

Bonet developed a reputation for being difficult to work with on The Cosby Show. Although nearly every main and recurring character who played a significant role on the series returned for The Cosby Show finale "And So We Commence", which revolves around Denise's younger brother Theo graduating from New York University, Bonet was not invited back to make a final appearance on the show after having been fired the previous year. Her character is, however, mentioned and used sparingly throughout the episode. Unseen, Denise calls her family on the telephone from Singapore to announce that she is pregnant with her and Martin's first child, and everyone receives an opportunity to congratulate her except Cliff. Bonet appeared on The Cosby Show on and off from 1984 to 1987, and from 1989 to 1991, for a grand total of 98 episodes between the ages of 17 and 24. She is credited as a main cast member from seasons one to three and six to seven, and a recurring cast member during seasons four and five.

According to PopCrunch, Bonet's feud with Cosby "has become just as legendary as the show" itself. Bonet has famously continued to avoid attending Cosby Show-related reunions and specials in the years since the show has ended. When Bonet declined to attend The Cosby Show: A Look Back, a retrospective television special hosted by NBC in 2002, she explained, "The whole experience and energy behind it felt disingenuous and motivated by corporate profit. I felt devalued and disrespected." When the Cosby Show cast was honored with the Impact Award at the 2011 TV Land Awards, Bonet was noticeably absent, citing "scheduling conflicts" as the official reason for her nonattendance. Actor Malcolm-Jamal Warner, who portrays Bonet's on-screen brother Theo, said "Lisa has always danced to the beat of her own drummer, which has worked for and against her"; Warner recalled being "surprised" when Bonet once attended a smaller-scale reunion that featured him and on-screen sisters Tempestt Bledsoe (Vanessa) and Keshia Knight Pulliam (Rudy) for Nickelodeon's Favorite Huxtable Contest. However, he admitted he admires Bonet for following her passion. Bonet and Tomei, both of whom were fired during the first season of A Different World, have remained close friends.

In 2018, Bonet, who has had little to no comment about the sexual assault allegations made by several women against Cosby, revealed that she had always felt a "type of sinister, shadow energy cannot be concealed" during her time working with Cosby. She maintains that her memories of her experience on the show have not been influenced by the allegations, insisting, "No, it's exactly as I remember it".

Characterization and fashion 
According to Eudie Pak of Biography, Denise was first introduced "as the popular girl with ever-changing hair and fashion". Martin Gitlin, author of The Greatest Sitcoms of All Time, described the character as "Stunningly attractive ... independent, intelligent, and proud." Denise eventually became known as "the wild child" of the Huxtable family as a result of her rebellious nature, outspokenness, eccentric clothing and tendency to date boys her father does not approve of. Josh Axelrod of College Magazine dubbed Denise "Cliff Huxtable's most frustrating child", standing apart from her siblings due to her inherent flightiness and restlessness. As "the most mellow Huxtable kid with a slightly boho style", the character also dresses in a manner that is distinguished from the moderate way in which her siblings dress. Denise's style has been described as bohemian and boho-chic. Developing a reputation as "a stylish dresser", the character frequently makes bold fashion statements, particularly via her vast assortment of hats and accessories, and variety of hair styles. Kamille Cooper, contributing to Vibe, described the character's wardrobe as "synonymous with 90's trends and groovy 70's-inspired prints–even more so perpetuated by her carefree persona", identifying "her ability to mix prints and patterns effortlessly to embellished adornments on fedoras and blazers". Denise typically wears oversized smocks, harem pants, jumpsuits, large blazers and head wraps with vibrant patterns, as well as denim and vintage tops. Glamour contributor Tracey Lomrantz Lester wrote that, in addition to fitted vests, the character dons "some of the most memorable headwear I've ever seen on TV." Alison Feldmann, writing for The Etsy Blog, described Denise as "fearless when it came to her appearance and could get away with seemingly anything". Refinery29 contributor Fara Prince agreed that Denise "got away with wearing the craziest outfits and changed her hairstyle constantly, all while maintaining that relaxed, cool-girl vibe." Brit + Co writer Rachel Aschenbrand-Robinson believes that the character's choice of clothing gave viewers the impression "that she actually gave no f**ks what anyone thought of her look."

College Fashion cited the character's interest in experimenting with geometric patterns, bright colors and a variety of textures. Bustle Cherise Luter believes that Denise's wardrobe "expressed [her] inner rebel." Jamie Broadnax of Black Girl Nerds identified Denise as a hipster, writing that the character was "a hipster before the word hipster was even a thing" due to her unconventional clothing choices and tendency to avoid imitating others, as well as her own method of doing things that she incorporates into the way she dresses. Denise's sense of fashion is also reflected in her hair; the character experiments with various hairstyles throughout The Cosby Show run, ranging from "androgynous short hair to natural curls [and] waist-length dreads." In later seasons, the character "exhibited more of a hippy-chick free spirit" closer to the way in which Bonet dresses outside of The Cosby Show. Denise's sense of fashion endures during her enrollment at Hillman. Andrea Linett, author of I Want to Be Her!: How Friends & Strangers Helped Shape My Style, described the character's wardrobe as "drapey and Japanese-y and so perfectly '80s", which she believes only improves once she transitions from The Cosby Show to A Different World. On the spin-off, Denise often gravitates towards menswear, high-waisted pants, and vintage clothing. Richard Pfefferman, author of Strategic Reinvention in Popular Culture: The Encore Impulse, described Denise as "Young, hip, trendy and colorful". Pfeifferman continued to describe the character as a "fun-loving, fashion-conscious, light-hearted teenage girl" who was "perfectly poised for gradual transformation into a serious and more thoughtful adult" on A Different World. Tara Ariano, author of Television Without Pity: 752 Things We Love to Hate (and Hate to Love) about TV, wrote that Denise embodies "the height of sophisticated teenager-hood" due to her "inexhaustible supply" of jewelry, blouses and leggings. According to Bonet, her character showed audiences "that it's okay to be a freak". However, Racked's Nadra Nittle argued that Denise remains rather "straight-laced" despite her artsy, unconventional wardrobe consisting of high-waisted trousers and tropical shirts.

Denise has been identified as a "drifter". Author Mark Whitaker wrote in his book Cosby: His Life and Times that the character resembles a "laconic mixture of sweetness and sarcasm that captured the ironic detachment that was becoming a hallmark of Generation X." Each Huxtable child "represents a different aspect on life." As a rebel who has been described as the Huxtable's "most troublesome child", Denise was often depicted as the opposite of Sondra, struggling to perform well academically unlike her older sister; Denise receives five Ds, one C and seven incompletes during her time at Hillman. While Sondra successfully graduates from Princeton University, Denise drops out of Hillman, travels to Africa and marries a Navy lieutenant instead, representing "that children don't always grow up how parents expect", according to the Ames Tribune. The Odyssey Online Tawana Charles observed that "Denise did what she had to do to get by, even when she had to call her parents to get out of a jam. She realized that there are things that you have to do for yourself, without your parents' help, and she did just that." Clover Hope of Jezebel agreed that the character "is determined to be independent—with no discipline or follow-through—and doesn't want her parents, Cliff and Clair Huxtable, to pay her way through college." Denise also stands apart from her college friends by being a "quirky, naive, indecisive flower child." Mike Vago of The A.V. Club observed that the Huxtable home begins to suffer from "Full Nest Syndrome" once Denise returns home from Africa, married and with a step child. Writing for the same publication, Joshua Alston believes that Bonet's real-life "earth-mother persona was integrated into the character, and became a riff on what rich-kid rebellion might look like for a wealthy black family." Denise has been nicknamed the Huxtable's "prodigal daughter" by the media.

Reception

The Cosby Show 
Denise quickly established herself as an audience favorite during the show's earliest seasons, which Mental Floss contributor Kara Kovalchik attributes to her "typical teenage carefree attitude and her cutting-edge fashion sense". Denise ultimately became the show's most popular character, and her unique fashion sense became a trademark of the series. Essence wrote that the character's clothes "captured the hearts of wholesome teeny-boppers all over America", while Abby White of the Nashville Scene agreed that the character "won our hearts with her sense of style from day one". White also joked that being one of Denise's three less popular sisters "must have really sucked". Popular and beloved by fans until her departure, Bonet became a "media darling", by whom she was crowned "America's Sweetheart". Idolized by teenage boys, she received the most fan mail out of the show's cast. Adored by millions of fans, Bonet's popularity grew almost overnight, soon establishing her as the show's breakout star and a household name. Fans swarmed the actress in public, often approaching her for fashion advice. Karen Heller of The Philadelphia Inquirer dubbed Bonet their "sartorial role model." Girls were drawn towards her bohemian sense of fashion, while boys found her to be very attractive and "a major heartthrob", admitting to having crushes on the actress throughout her tenure. According to Hollywood.com, Bonet "struck a chord" among The Cosby Show fans with "her ethereal beauty and quiet strength". Vibe Greg Tate believes Bonet's performance "won the heart of just about every young black woman who didn't fit the mold of debutante, fly girl or hoochie mama". Hillary Crosley Coker of Jezebel described Bonet as "the coolest of The Cosby Show cast", while Refinery29 Kara Kia believes that Bonet and Denise were equally "admired for [their] rebellious, elusive approach to celebrity." In "An Ode To Lisa Bonet As Denise Huxtable", Uproxx contributor Greg Whitt praised the actress: "I loved how you were never willing to mute your personality in a house full of squares. Your hair was short and untamed. Your outfits never matched but always worked ... You were sexy before I knew what sexy was. Vanessa was too annoying, and Rudy was too young, but, Denise ahem Lisa, you were the one."

Julee Wilson of HuffPost described the character as "head-strong yet lovable". Rebekah Williams, writing for Her Campus, called Denise's personality "charming". In a retrospective review of the series, Funny or Die dubbed Denise "your Tumblr crush", writing, "She was wild. Sexy. Artistic. A free spirit. But mostly, she was just fierce. Girls wanted to be her. Boys wanted to be with her. Boys also probably wanted to be her." Who What Wear identified Denise as the main reason they continue to watch reruns of The Cosby Show, citing her clothes as the primary factor in their "dedicated viewership" while dubbing her "a total 80's urban dreamgirl." Writing for The Atlantic, Joe Reid ranked Denise the best Huxtable child, praising both Bonet's performance and the character's "flakiness". Reid concluded, "Denise managed to be equal parts cool and disaster, without ever selling out either part." Writing for the same publication, Kevin O'Keefe ranked Denise lower at number five because he often struggled to "understand her motivations", finding it implausible that a free-spirited woman like Denise would be interested in "a straight-edge [man] like Martin". However, O'Keefe admitted that he enjoyed her role in the episode "A Shirt Story". The episode is often positively reviewed as one of the character's best; Zeba Blay, senior culture writer for HuffPost, called the moment Theo screams "Denise!" upon trying on the shirt Denise sewed for her brother as her favorite scene. Bonet was nominated for a Primetime Emmy Award for Outstanding Supporting Actress in a Comedy Series at the 38th Primetime Emmy Awards in 1986.

Bonet's controversial role in Angel Heart was met with strong backlash from devoted Cosby Show fans, some of whom felt that she had betrayed Denise's "wholesome" image. Some media headlines, such as USA Today "X has Cosby kid's film on spot", gave readers the impression that "all 77 million weekly watchers are outraged by the behavior of their little Denise", according to Trustman Senger of The Washington Post. The fact that Bonet, a Cosby Show cast member, had been cast in a sex scene with co-star Mickey Rorke garnered far more media coverage than whether or not the film deserved the X rating it had originally been assigned. Maintaining that he had never seen an episode of The Cosby Show prior to casting Bonet, Angel Heart director Alan Parker admitted he was unprepared for the public's reaction, elaborating, "I was naive not to realize ... what she represented within that show was maybe a role model for young black American kids." When the film was released, an overwhelming number of The Cosby Show fans asked Bonet to reveal what Cosby thought of her performance. Cosby eventually said that he was not particularly fond of Bonet's role in the film, which he dismissed as "a movie made by white America that cast a black girl, gave her voodoo things to do and have sex." Envisioning Black Feminist Voodoo Aesthetics: African Spirituality in American Cinema author Kameelah L. Martin believes that Cosby's avoidance of the film only augmented the controversy surrounding Bonet's role. Victor Valle of the Los Angeles Times wondered if the sex scene would harm Bonet's "wholesome TV image" on both The Cosby Show and the then-upcoming A Different World. Maintaining that she had been unaware of Denise's wholesome reputation prior to appearing in Angel Heart, Bonet insisted "My obligation wasn't to Denise. I felt obligated to myself and my career."

A Different World 
As one of the decade's most popular actresses, A Different World initially attempted to capitalize on Bonet's fame by featuring Denise prominently. Although the spin-off garnered strong viewership due to airing immediately after its parent program, critics were largely unimpressed with its first season and Denise's role, often blaming her characterization and Bonet's performance for the show's lackluster reviews. Mark Harris, contributing to Entertainment Weekly, wrote that "Bonet proved hollow as the center of a sitcom". People television critic Jeff Jarvis accused NBC of "steal[ing] Lisa Bonet away, diluting Cosby only so she could star in a watery, bland series of her own." Jarvis continued, "I only hope NBC has the sense to forgive Bonet and welcome her home, where she's always been terrific, on Cosby." The Chicago Tribune Clifford Terry felt that Bonet was not "a compelling enough actress to carry a show by herself". Nadra Nittle of Racked accused Denise's "dull" personality of causing the show's inaugural season to "fall flat". Emily VanDerWerff, writing for The A.V. Club, agreed that the actress "wasn't yet ready to carry a show", blaming her "sleepy demeanor and subdued line readings" for prompting audiences to gravitate towards more interesting supporting characters. Emily Nussbaum, television critic for The New York Times, reviewed Denise as "so diffident she seemed barely there." However, Tawana Charles of The Odyssey Online appreciated A Different World for not depicting Denise as "an honor[s] student." Despite initially being inspired to attend college by watching her "favorite character ... take off on her own via 'A Different World', Jeneé Osterheldt, writing for The Kansas City Star, similarly enjoyed Denise's arc for proving that "I didn't need to be flawless like her."

Writer and executive producer Susan Fales defended Bonet's acting: "the character was far more at fault [than Bonet]. Denise was not very interesting, and we were asked to make her into Mary Tyler Moore or Tinkerbell, always bringing everyone together. We couldn't." Critics and audiences found that the character was constantly being upstaged by Whitley Gilbert (Jasmine Guy). After Bonet's departure, Whitley replaced Denise as A Different World main character, and the series underwent major revisions to focus on her and other supporting characters. Although the producers expected viewers to miss Denise, critics generally conceded that Whitley, in whom audiences had always shown more interest, offered better television than Denise. Linda Hobbs of Vibe wrote that A Different World "success only grew after Bonet left".

However, some fans lamented Denise's departure. AfterEllen.com contributor Dana Piccoli found it difficult to continue enjoying A Different World without Bonet, expounding, "I hung on for a couple of seasons but my heart wasn't in it with Bonet gone." Recognizing Denise's characterization on A Different World among 752 Things We Love to Hate (and Hate to Love) about TV, author Tara Ariano wrote that young female fans were generally unbothered by Bonet's tendency to "deliver her lines either in a monotone or screechy whine" while "looking at Denise with the eyes of love." Erin Faith Wilson of AfterEllen.com called A Different World one of her favorite shows "because of my love for Denise Huxtable", elaborating, "her clothes were amazing, she was incredibly intelligent and she didn't put up with shit from anyone ... At the time, she seemed to scream feminism and I couldn't get enough." Bustle Rikki Byrd wrote, "Although it was sad to see her go, the little bit of time she was on offered up enough style inspiration to last a decade." Although most viewers dismissed the show as an unsuccessful spin-off of The Cosby Show in the immediate wake of Bonet's departure, A Different World proved successful and would go on to air for five more seasons without Bonet. In a retrospective review of Denise's role on A Different World, Jezebel Clover Hope wrote "there's nothing that fascinating about Denise", who she described as "an atrocious student." However, Hope admitted that the character is popular due to her wardrobe and audiences being able to relate to "her frazzled state of mind", concluding, "Really, we weren't all that different from Denise." Some of My Best Friends Are Black: The Strange Story of Integration in America author Tanner Colby reported that applications to historically black colleges and universities in America increased by 14% one year after Denise started attending Hillman, while mostly white colleges experienced their first noticeable decrease in African American enrollment since the civil rights era.

Impact and legacy 
Denise remains Bonet's best-known role. In his biography of the actress, Michael Hastings of AllMovie wrote that after Bonet "asserted herself as one of the most memorable kids in the Huxtable clan", she has since "enjoying a longevity that few former child stars can claim." Bonet was one of the most popular young actresses of the 1980s and 1990s. According to Refinery29 Kara Kia, the actress, much like her character, is equally "admired for her rebellious, elusive approach to celebrity and, of course, her killer sense of style". Bob McCann, author of Encyclopedia of African American Actresses in Film and Television, believes an entire generation of African-American teenagers "grew up with a crush on" Denise. The Root Erin E. Evans summarized Denise as "the eccentric daughter whom every young Cosby fan either wanted to be like or be with." Established as a style icon, The Guardian Danielle Henderson credits the character with introducing television viewers to "boho chic 30 years before" it became a popular fashion trend. Evans agreed that Denise "was setting trends with her eclectic style", which was largely embraced by the public. Vibe Kamille Cooper crowned the character "the epitome of the Bohemian Chic" while dubbing her fashion sense an iconic "pop culture phenomenon", crediting Lemire with most of its success. In 2013, Cooper observed that women continue to emulate Denise's style more than 20 years after the show's finale. Kara Kia of Refinery29 named Denise's bohemian aesthetic one of the decade's defining looks. In 2014, Bustle recognized 15 ways Denise "Proved She Was A Fashion Icon", comparing her impact to those of Carrie Bradshaw from Sex and the City and the cast of Gossip Girl. Author Cherise Luter wrote, "While well suited for the '80s, the mix of boho punk would mesh perfectly with any current street style blog or indie magazine, which is a testament to Lemire's talent as a designer." The same website published a list of "Lisa Bonet's Best Style Moments" during her tenure on A Different World. Similarly, The Odyssey Online Bianca Eugene cited "15 Reasons Why Denise Huxtable Is A Fashion Icon", elaborating that the character "has proven that no matter how outrageous her outfit or hairstyle may be, she still looks good." Agreeing that Denise is a precursor to Carrie Bradshaw and Cookie Lyon from Empire, Julee Wilson, senior fashion editor for HuffPost, named the character "one of our first TV style crushes", crediting her with teaching audiences how to layer and accessorize their outfits. The Etsy Blog's Alison Feldmann wrote that Denise's "loud style remain[s] iconic as ever", while Brit + Co dubbed Denise "the eclectic style queen of college". In her book I Want to Be Her!: How Friends & Strangers Helped Shape My Style, author Andrea Linett crowned Denise "The first television character who really had style", identifying her as the main reason she watched The Cosby Show. Linett concluded, "To this day, there is no one I would rather look like than [Bonet]."

Elle included Denise in an article recognizing "The 50 Best Dressed Women on TV". Unranked, Glamour featured the character among "The 9 Best Dressed TV Characters Of All Time", with author Tracey Lomrantz Lester dubbing her "the best dressed kid on The Cosby Show". Essence considers her to be among "TV's Best-Dressed Characters", while Harper's Bazaar recognized her for having one of "The 15 Most Iconic TV Wardrobes". BuzzFeed ranked Denise the most fashionable television character of the 1990s, crowning her the "undisputed style icon of the '80s and '90s". StyleCaster ranked Denise eighth on their countdown of "The 50 Most Stylish TV Characters Of All Time", writing, "Few TV characters have been as fearless when it comes to fashion as The Cosby Show Denise Huxtable ... we'll forver (sic) be in awe of Denise's style." HelloGiggles placed Denise at number four on the website's ranking of "17 TV Moms We Would Totally Borrow Clothes From"; author Sophia Elias declared, "Denise Huxtable may very well go down as one of the most stylish characters in television history" and "boho-chic executed to perfection." Marie Claire included Denise at number six on their "15 Female TV Characters That Have Incredible Hair" ranking. HelloGiggles featured her among "The Best Beauty Looks From Your Fave '90s Characters", with author Farah Prince dubbing her the "one person from the '90s I wanted to emulate the most" while complimenting praising her sparse use of makeup. Refinery29 crowned Denise one of their "favorite '80s fashion heroes", calling her a constant source of "inspiration (and hairspiration)." Glamour ranked Bonet among the best style icons of the decade, describing her as "he most beautiful and wholesome girl on TV" at the time.

Sherri Williams of The Washington Post described both Denise and Bonet as "an it-girl of the 1980s whose unique style and independence endeared audiences." According to Nick Slay of The Source, Denise established herself as a "pop culture icon". AfterEllen.com's Erin Faith Wilson called Denise one of her favorite television crushes from the 1980s and 1990s. Refinery29 featured Denise in an article recognizing "TV Sisters We Always Wanted In Our Family". HelloGiggles ranked Denise first on its ranking of "10 TV Characters Who Would Make Awesome Big Sisters", calling her "magnetic to watch" due to her free-spirited personality and sense of fashion. The Washington Post recognized Denise as a template for "How TV handles beloved characters going off to college", which Uproxx's Alan Sepinwall described as "Tak[ing] the most popular/exciting/funny character who's not the lead, and trust that they can carry a new show on their own". College Magazine ranked Denise the fifth best fictional college student. Denise's "replacement" Pam was not particularly well-received by fans after she was written out of the series. StyleBlazer included Denise in an article recognizing "7 Replaced Classic TV Characters We Never Got Over", writing, "Dont get us wrong, Pam was comedy, but we never stopped missing Denise." In 2012, clothing company Urban Outfitters created a clothing line inspired by Denise entitled "A Different World", describing it as "a nod to the coolest older sister ever". Business Insider criticized the organization for hiring a white model Dana Boulos to promote the clothing line, arguing "that most Urban customers wouldn't even know who Denise is." Denise has served as a blueprint for and inspired a generation of young, middle-class female television characters attending college. According to Soraya Nadia McDonald of The Undefeated, "Girls modeled on Denise are smart, but their intellect isn't necessarily reflected in their grades. They're sheltered, and they move through college under ideal, manageable circumstances. And they're presented as typical, pleasant girls who should be completely relatable for white America."

In 2018, a spin-off of the sitcom Black-ish premiered. Entitled Grown-ish, the spin-off revolves around one of the show's characters Zoey (Yara Shahidi) leaving home and attending college; the spin-off's college-related storyline and main character have drawn extensive comparisons to Denise, with both series initially "focus[ing] on the college experience of the oldest daughter in a middle-class black family." A. Bottinick of TV Insider identified both characters' pursuit of higher education and African American heritage among their similarities, dubbing them both "the teen style icons of their time and—quite surprisingly, considering their shows take place years apart—have donned quite a few of the same looks." The York Dispatch Rick Bentley anticipated that Zoey would be successful because she is imbued with "the same kind of sweetness that was written into Bonet's character so many years ago." The Glow Up contributor S. D. Chrismon believes it is unfair to compare Zoey to her predecessor "any more than Black-ish really compares to The Cosby Show", despite both characters' similarities that include fashion and wit.

References

Television characters introduced in 1984
Fictional African-American people
The Cosby Show characters
Fictional characters from Brooklyn
American female characters in television
Fictional college students
Fictional photographers